The Nettleton School District is a public school district based in Nettleton, Mississippi (USA).

The district serves northwestern Monroe and southeastern Lee counties.

Schools
Nettleton High School
Nettleton Intermediate School
Nettleton Primary School

Demographics

2006-07 school year
There were a total of 1,359 students enrolled in the Nettleton School District during the 2006–2007 school year. The gender makeup of the district was 50% female and 50% male. The racial makeup of the district was 27.74% African American, 71.52% White, 0.66% Hispanic, and 0.07% Asian. 52.0% of the district's students were eligible to receive free lunch.

Previous school years

Accountability statistics

Racially segregated student government election policy

On August 26, 2010, The Smoking Gun posted a memo which Nettleton Middle School had distributed to all students in grades 6–8.  The memo described the rules for the student government election, including specifications that only students of particular races be elected to particular posts.  Of the twelve posts, eight were reserved for white students.  The highest posts, the president for each grade level, were all reserved for whites.
  Some parents complained about this policy.  At around the same time, school superintendent Russell Taylor issued a statement saying that the policy was being reviewed.  As a firestorm of news coverage developed in the next day, the school board voted in an emergency meeting on August 27, 2010 to reverse the policy.  The district's press release stated that the policy had existed for over 30 years, and was intended to "ensure minority representation and involvement in the student body."

See also
List of school districts in Mississippi

References

External links
 

History of racism in Mississippi
Education in Lee County, Mississippi
Education in Monroe County, Mississippi
School districts in Mississippi